Response time may refer to:

The time lag between an electronic input and the output signal which depends upon the value of passive components used.
Responsiveness, how quickly an interactive system responds to user input
Response time (biology), the elapsed time from the presentation of a sensory stimulus to the completion of the subsequent behavioral response
Response time (technology), the time a generic system or functional unit takes to react to a given input
 Display response time, the amount of time a pixel in a display takes to change
Round-trip delay time, in telecommunications
Emergency response time, the amount of time that emergency responders take to arrive at the scene of an incident from the time that the emergency response system was activated
Search response time or query response time, the time it takes a web server to respond when it receives a query

See also
Delay (disambiguation)
Latency (disambiguation)